Through Siberia by Accident: A Small Slice of Autobiography is a book by Irish author Dervla Murphy. It was first published by John Murray in 2005.

Summary
Through Siberia by Accident records a trip made when Murphy was seventy-three, with a catalogue of accidents on that and previous outings.

References

External links
 

2005 non-fiction books
John Murray (publishing house) books
Books by Dervla Murphy